City Hall in Columbia, Missouri, also known as the Daniel Boone Building, was built in 1917. A major addition and restoration was completed in 2011, along with a matching five-story structure. Originally built as a hotel, it has functioned as the city hall of Columbia since 1972 by (respectively) replacing the municipal building across the street. The building is a contributing property on the National Register of Historic Places in the Downtown Columbia, Missouri historic district and is at the intersection of Broadway  and the Avenue of the Columns. The chambers of the Columbia City Council are on the ground floor.

References

External links
 City of Columbia

Government of Columbia, Missouri
Buildings and structures in Columbia, Missouri
City halls in Missouri
City and town halls on the National Register of Historic Places in Missouri
National Register of Historic Places in Boone County, Missouri
Historic district contributing properties in Missouri